Rita Blanco (born 11 January 1963) is a Portuguese actress. She has appeared in more than 50 films and television shows since 1983. She starred in the film Get a Life, which was screened in the Un Certain Regard section at the 2001 Cannes Film Festival.

Selected filmography

Film
 Agosto (1987)
 Anxiety (1998)
 Get a Life (2001)
 In the Darkness of the Night (2004)
 Blood of My Blood (2011)
 Amour (2012)
 The Gilded Cage (2013)
 Bad Living (2023)
 Living Bad (2023)

Television
 Conta-me como foi (2007 - 2011, 2019 - )
 O Pai Tirano (2022)
 Por Ti (2023)
 Flor Sem Tempo (2023)
 Marco Paulo (2023)

Dubbing roles

Animated films
 Finding Nemo - Dory (Portuguese Dub) (2003)
 Arthur and the Minimoys - Arthur's Mom (Portuguese Dub) (2006)
 Despicable Me 2 - Lucy Wilde (Portuguese Dub) (2013)
 Finding Dory - Dory (Portuguese Dub) (2016)
 Despicable Me 3 - Lucy Wilde (Portuguese Dub) (2017)

References

External links

1963 births
Living people
Portuguese film actresses
Portuguese voice actresses
Actresses from Lisbon
Golden Globes (Portugal) winners
20th-century Portuguese actresses
21st-century Portuguese actresses